DWAB-TV, channel 22, is a television headquarters ownership of Subic Broadcasting Corporation. Its studio and transmitter are located at Admiral Royale Building, 17 Street cor. Anonas Street, Brgy. West Bajac-Bajac, Olongapo. It is approved by the government under Republic Act No. 7511 of the Philippine Constitution to serve Olongapoand Subic Bay Freeport Zone.

The station is an affiliate station of the TV5 Network Inc. since 2013, serving the people of Olongapo City and the Subic Bay Freeport Zone.

Membership
Central Luzon Media Association
Kapisanan ng Mga Broadkaster ng Pilipinas

See also
 97.5 dwOK FM
 GO AM 1008

References

 
 
 
 

Television stations in Olongapo
Television channels and stations established in 2011
TV5 (Philippine TV network) stations